Rex Covered Bridge is a historic wooden covered bridge located in North Whitehall Township in Lehigh County, Pennsylvania. It has narrow horizontal siding and a gable roof. It crosses Jordan Creek.

It was listed on the National Register of Historic Places in 1980.

References 

Covered bridges on the National Register of Historic Places in Pennsylvania
Covered bridges in Lehigh County, Pennsylvania
Bridges completed in 1858
Wooden bridges in Pennsylvania
Bridges in Lehigh County, Pennsylvania
Tourist attractions in Lehigh County, Pennsylvania
National Register of Historic Places in Lehigh County, Pennsylvania
Road bridges on the National Register of Historic Places in Pennsylvania
Burr Truss bridges in the United States